The list of ship commissionings in 1897 includes a chronological list of all ships commissioned in 1897.


See also 

1897
 Ship commissionings